Re Judiciary & navigation Acts 1921 29 CLR 257 is a landmark Australian judgment of the High Court.  
The matter related to what is a legal matter and the High Court's ability to issue opinion outside a case.

Background
The Attorney-General of the State of Victoria, raised an  objection that  section 88 of the Judiciary Act 1903 was beyond the powers of the Commonwealth Parliament.

Finding
The court found that, like in the United States, the Court could not issue legal opinion unattached to a specific case. The joint majority judgment stated:
But we can find nothing in Chapter III of the Constitution to lend colour to the view that parliament can confer power or jurisdiction upon the High Court to determine abstract questions of law without the right or duty of any body or person being involved.
 
On the issue of what constituted a matter they said:
In our opinion there can be no matter within the meaning of s 76 of the Constitution unless there is some immediate right, duty or liability to be established by the determination of the Court.

References

High Court of Australia cases
1921 in case law
1921 in Australian law